SWT may refer to:

 Scottish Wildlife Trust, a charity in Scotland
 Subhanahu wa ta'ala, Arabic for "The most glorified, the most high", Muslim honorific for God
 Stationary wavelet transform, a wavelet transform algorithm
 Standard Widget Toolkit, a graphical widget toolkit for use with the Java platform
 Slaithwaite railway station, England; National Rail station code
 South West Trains, a former train operating company in southern England
 Srowot railway station, Indonesia; station code
 Stepped-wedge trial, a type of randomised controlled trial
 the ICAO airline code for Swiftair
 Sweat: an abbreviation for a plumbing connection using solder to join pipe and fittings 
 Sweetener World Tour, a 2019 tour by Ariana Grande
 Smash World Tour, a discontinued esports tournament circuit for the Super Smash Bros. series